Chloë Alexandra Adele Emily Agnew (born 1989) is an Irish singer and songwriter, best known for being an original and former member of the Celtic music group Celtic Woman.

Early life and career 

Agnew was born to Irish entertainer Adele "Twink" King and Irish oboist David Agnew in Knocklyon, County Dublin, where she lived with her mother and younger sister, Naomi.

She made her first television appearance on her mother's programme aged four weeks old, and later sang on the show at the age of six. She attended Notre Dame des Missions Junior School for her primary school education, followed by Alexandra College girls' school.

In 1998, Agnew represented Ireland and was the winner of the Grand Prix at the First International Children's Song Competition in Cairo with a song called The Friendship Tree. She then began to perform pantomime at the Olympia Theatre in Dublin and continued in that role for four years.

In 1999, she appeared in The Young Messiah, a modern adaptation of Handel's Messiah. In this production, she played one of the children and performed sign language.

Musical career 
Agnew has sung in English, Irish, Latin, Italian, and German and has a soprano vocal range.

In 2000, aged 11, Agnew approached director David Downes about recording a song to raise money for the children of Afghanistan. With his help, she recorded Angel of Mercy for the album This Holy Christmas Night, which raised over £20,000 for the Afghan Children's Charity Fund in 2001. That same year, she joined the Christ Church Cathedral Girls' Choir, and remained a member for three years.

In 2002, she was signed to Celtic Collections, and with the backing of Downes she recorded her debut album Chloë. In 2004, she released her second album, Chloë: Walking in the Air. She also recorded a companion DVD for her second album, released in Europe in 2004 and in North America in 2007.

She appeared as part of the group Celtic Woman at The Helix in Dublin in 2004, the youngest member at the time. Agnew has been featured on 14 albums with the group, recording songs in multiple languages and taking part in several world tours.

In 2009, Agnew was invited by Italian tenor Alessandro Rinella to sing with him on his debut album.

In 2012, Agnew was named Female Vocalist of the Year at the Irish Music Awards.

On 5 August 2013, Celtic Woman announced Agnew would be taking a break from Celtic Woman to focus on solo projects. Her position was filled by Derry-born singer Mairéad Carlin.

After leaving Celtic Woman, Agnew was chosen to be the special guest of the Celtic Thunder cruise. She, along with former Celtic Thunder member Paul Byrom, was also a special guest of Lisa Kelly's concerts called The Voice of Ireland and A Celtic Christmas. Agnew was also part of Ethan Bortnick's concert with another former Celtic Thunder member Damian McGinty.

Agnew did a concert performance with her boyfriend Dermot Kiernan and American singer-songwriters Kate Steinway and Marissa Lauren in the LA Songwriting school on 2015.

On 22 January 2020, it was announced that Agnew was returning to Celtic Woman for the US Celebration Tour to fill in for Éabha McMahon, who was taking a leave from the group. However the tour was postponed shortly after due to the COVID-19 pandemic. On 21 April 2020, Agnew announced that she would be rejoining the group for the rescheduled Celebration Tour.  Agnew then announced that she would participate in the Postcards from Ireland Tour as well as the Postcards from Ireland album and TV special/DVD. On 19 August 2022, Agnew announced that she would be taking a break from group once again to focus on solo projects. 

During an interview by Beliefnet, Agnew commented on Irish music:

Agnew is a member of the Roman Catholic Church. She often says prayers just before going on stage to "Calm her nerves".

Discography
 Solo

 With Celtic Woman

References

External links 

 
 
 Profile at Celticwoman.com

1989 births
20th-century Irish women singers
21st-century Irish women singers
Living people
Celtic Woman members
Irish-language singers
Musicians from Dublin (city)
Performers of Christian music
German-language singers
Latin-language singers
Italian-language singers
Irish child singers
Irish sopranos
People educated at Alexandra College